Hak Ji Sa Co, Ltd. is a South Korean publishing house company. established in 1992 and headquartered in Seogyo-dong, Mapo-gu, Seoul. It specialises in publications on psychology, education, medicine, disability, and welfare. So far, it has translated and published more than 1,400 books. The present CEO is Kim Jin-hwan (김진환).

Divisions
Publish Works Works Division
Psychology Research Division
Internet Works Division

Imprints
Hak Ji Sa Publishment
K-Pai
New Nonmun

See also
Korean studies

External links
Hak Ji Sa Homepage (in Korean)
K-Pai Homepage (in Korean)
New Nonmun Homepage (in Korean)

Book publishing companies of South Korea
Publishing companies established in 1992
Mass media in Seoul